Estradiol palmitate (brand name Esmopal), or estradiol monopalmitate, also known as estradiol 17β-hexadecanoate, is a naturally occurring steroidal estrogen and an estrogen ester – specifically, the C17β palmitate ester of estradiol. It occurs in the body as a very long-lasting metabolite and prohormone of estradiol. The compound has no affinity for the estrogen receptor, requiring transformation into estradiol for its estrogenic activity. In addition to its endogenous role, estradiol palmitate was formerly used as a fattening agent in chickens under the brand name Esmopal.

See also
 Estradiol stearate
 Estradiol undecylate
 List of estrogen esters § Estradiol esters

References

Abandoned drugs
Estradiol esters
Palmitate esters
Veterinary drugs